Middle Huaxia Road is an interchange station on Lines 13 and 16 of the Shanghai Metro. On 30 December 2018, it became an interchange station with Line 13 when the phases 2 and 3 extensions of the line to  became operational.

Station Layout

References

Railway stations in Shanghai
Shanghai Metro stations in Pudong
Line 16, Shanghai Metro
Line 13, Shanghai Metro
Railway stations in China opened in 2014